Samuel Ovenshine (April 2, 1843 – July 5, 1932) was a United States Army officer who served as a brigadier general during the Philippine–American War.

Biography
Ovenshine was born on April 2, 1843 in Philadelphia. He was studying to become a lawyer when he was interrupted by the outbreak of the Civil War. On September 25, 1861 he was appointed first lieutenant in the 5th U.S. Infantry Regiment. He served in Kansas and New Mexico and ended the war as a captain.

Ovenshine stayed with the 5th U.S. during the Indian Wars. His unit formed the vanguard of Alfred H. Terry's column during the aftermath of the Battle of Little Bighorn and served in Nelson A. Miles' force at the Battle of Bearpaw Mountain.

Ovenshine was promoted to major in the 23rd United States Infantry on July 10, 1885 and commanded the post of Fort Davis in 1890. He was promoted to lieutenant colonel of the 15th United States Infantry Regiment on January 31, 1891 and colonel of the 23rd United States Infantry Regiment on April 26, 1895.

Colonel Ovenshine and the 23rd U.S. were sent to the Philippines during the Spanish–American War as part of Wesley Merritt's Eighth Army Corps. The fighting against the Spanish had already subsided by the time Ovenshine arrived, but hostilities between the U.S. Army and Filipinos were now growing.

Ovenshine was promoted to brigadier general of volunteers by the end of September 1898 and took command of the 2nd Brigade in Arthur MacArthur's 1st Division of Eighth Corps. Ovenshine led his brigade during the battle of Manila in 1899 and during the battle of Zapote Bridge. He received a Silver Star for his actions in these two battles. On October 18, 1899 he was promoted to brigadier general in the U.S. Army and two days later retired.

General Ovenshine and his wife, the former Sallie Yeatman Thompson, had seven children. He died in Washington D.C. on July 5, 1932 and was buried in Section 1 of Arlington National Cemetery.

References

1843 births
1932 deaths
American military personnel of the Philippine–American War
Burials at Arlington National Cemetery
Military personnel from Philadelphia
People of Pennsylvania in the American Civil War
Recipients of the Silver Star
Union Army officers
United States Army generals